List of mayors of Brno:

See also
 Timeline of Brno

Mayors
Brno
Lists of mayors